Strange Weather Lately is the first album by Scottish guitar-pop fourpiece Astrid. The title originated from the comics and graphic novel series Strange Weather Lately (1996-1999) by the creative duo Metaphrog, a.k.a. Sandra Marrs and John Chalmers.

Track listing
"Kitchen T.V."  – 2:39
"Plastic Skull"  – 2:49
"High in the Morning"  – 2:39
"Zoo"  – 2:29
"Standing in Line"  – 3:07
"Bottle"  – 2:31
"Redground"  – 3:15
"Like a Baby"  – 1:58
"Stop"  – 3:33
"Dusty"  – 2:53
"Boat Song"  – 2:21
"Boy or Girl"  – 1:56
"W.O.P.R.M."  – 4:52

References

External links
 Austin Chronicle review
 NME review

1999 debut albums
Astrid (band) albums
Fantastic Plastic Records albums